Coccovello is a mountain of Basilicata, southern Italy and an example of karst topography.

Mountains of Basilicata